The Dubai Tour is an annual professional road bicycle racing stage race held in Dubai, which began in 2014 as part of the UCI Asia Tour.

History
The race was classified as a 2.1. in 2014. The race is organized by the Dubai Sports Council in partnership with RCS Sport, and was held for the first time between 5 and 8 February 2014. The race is a men's competition consisting of four stages. The race contains mainly flat stages, with some hillier parts. In 2015, the second edition of the race has been upgraded to 2.HC, meaning that more UCI World Tour teams can compete in the event.

During the race, the leader of the general classification wears a blue jersey, the leader of points classification is denoted by a red jersey and best young rider by white. The race does not award a mountains jersey.

In 2019, the Dubai Tour was merged with the nearby Abu Dhabi Tour to become the UAE Tour.

Past winners

References

External links

 
 Tour of Dubai Cycling

 
UCI Asia Tour races
Recurring sporting events established in 2014
Sports competitions in Dubai
Cycle races in the United Arab Emirates
2014 establishments in the United Arab Emirates
Winter events in the United Arab Emirates
Recurring sporting events disestablished in 2018
2018 disestablishments in the United Arab Emirates
Defunct cycling races the United Arab Emirates